The Guards Mechanized Brigade is one of the two main tactical components of the Croatian Army. The brigade is based in southern Croatia with main headquarters in Knin.

History
The Brigade was formed following a major restructuring of the Croatian Army. The four main brigades and reserve brigades were merged into four battalions which were each designated one of their badges and nicknames and continue their predecessor brigade's lineage and traditions.

Main role
The Brigade's main role is defence of Croatia's territorial integrity and sovereignty as well as participating in NATO and international peace-keeping operations, as well as planning and conducting staff and unit training in accordance with domestic and international commitments of the Republic of Croatia.

Main tasks
Plan and conduct the tasks related to military operations;
Prepare training and activity with accordance of domestic defence doctrine;
Organize, conduct, evaluate and analyze training of subunits in order to achieve mission tasks;
Take part in national and international military operations, exercises and military cooperation;
Provide information and reports to the higher headquarters concerning implementation of training and activity plans;
Provide assistance to state and municipal institutions by responding to threats of a non-military nature;
Maintain close relationship with the local community and participate in their activities.

Structure
 Mechanized Guards Brigade, Knin
 HQ Company, Knin
 1st Mechanized Battalion "Tigers", Petrinja (Patria AMV)
 2nd Mechanized Battalion "Thunders", Petrinja (Patria AMV)
 3rd Mechanized Battalion "Spiders", Knin (Patria AMV)
 Motorized Battalion "Wolves", Gospić (Oshkosh)
 Artillery Battalion, Slunj (D-30 RH M94 122mm howitzers and APR–40 122mm multiple rocket launchers)
 Air Defence Battalion, Benkovac
 Engineer Battalion, Sinj
 Reconnaissance Company, Knin
 Signal Company, Knin
 Logistic Company, Knin

Deployments
Elements of the Brigade have been deployed to Golan Heights on UNDOF and to Afghanistan as part of ISAF.

See also
 1st Guards Brigade (Croatia)
 2nd Guards Brigade (Croatia)
 4th Guards Brigade (Croatia)
 7th Guards Brigade (Croatia)
 9th Guards Brigade (Croatia)

References

External links
Article about GMB in Hrvatski vojnik, January 2009 

Military units and formations established in 2007
Brigades of Croatia
2007 establishments in Croatia